Killing Hitler is a BBC drama examining the Operation Foxley plot to kill Adolf Hitler. Written and directed by Jeremy Lovering, it was first broadcast on 30 March 2003.

Cast
 Peter McDonald as LB/X
 Kenneth Cranham as Brigadier Sir Stewart Menzies
 Kate Ashford as Rachel Cathcart
 Keith Allen as Major General Colin Gubbins

External links
Killing Hitler by Professor Duncan Anderson at BBC History
Characters in Killing Hitler at BBC History
 

BBC television dramas
Failed assassins of Adolf Hitler